Mishveli Church “Pitchu-Okhvame” is a church in the village of Mishveli, Ochamchire municipality, Autonomous Republic of Abkhazia, Georgia.

History 
The church was built in the late Middle Ages. The construction represents a hall church, which was built with uncut stones and pebbles. The church is heavily damaged. The church walls are in a poor physical condition and need an urgent conservation.

References 

Religious buildings and structures in Georgia (country)
Religious buildings and structures in Abkhazia
Churches in Abkhazia